
Gmina Karlino is an urban-rural gmina (administrative district) in Białogard County, West Pomeranian Voivodeship, in north-western Poland.

Villages
Apart from the town of Karlino, Gmina Karlino contains the villages and settlements of Brzeźno, Chotyń, Czerwięcino, Daszewo, Dębolas, Domacyno, Garnki, Gościnko, Karlinko, Karścino, Karwin, Kowańcz, Krzywopłoty, Lubiechowo, Lubiechowo-Przystanek, Malonowo, Mierzyn, Mierzynek, Pobłocie Wielkie, Ubysławice, Wietszyno, Witolub, Wyganów and Zwartowo.

Neighbouring gminas
Gmina Karlino is bordered by the gminas of Będzino, Białogard, Biesiekierz, Dygowo, Gościno and Sławoborze.

References
Polish official population figures 2006

Karlino
Białogard County